Lindaweni Fanetri (born 18 January 1989) is a former Indonesian badminton player. She played in women's singles. Fanetri is from PB. Suryanaga, a badminton club from Surabaya, the same club with the likes of Sony Dwi Kuncoro, Alvent Yulianto, and Ryan Agung Saputra.

Career 

In 2012 Fanetri managed to become champion in India Grand Prix Gold and runner up at Chinese Taipei and Vietnam Open. In 2015 Fanetri  won a bronze medal at 2015 BWF World Championships after losing to Saina Nehwal in the semifinals. In her quarterfinal match, she was down 14–20 in the second game after losing the first game against Tai Tzu-ying of Chinese Taipei. But Lindaweni saved 6 match points and eventually took the second game, 22–20. She won the decider third game to ensure her place in the semifinals.

Achievements

BWF World Championships 
Women's singles

BWF Grand Prix (1 title, 2 runners-up) 
The BWF Grand Prix had two levels, the Grand Prix and Grand Prix Gold. It was a series of badminton tournaments sanctioned by the Badminton World Federation (BWF) and played between 2007 and 2017.

Women's singles

  BWF Grand Prix Gold tournament
  BWF Grand Prix tournament

Participation at Indonesian team 
 3 times at Uber Cup (2010, 2012, 2014)
 4 times at Sudirman Cup (2009, 2011, 2013, 2015)

Performance timeline

National team 
 Junior level

 Senior level

Individual competitions 
 Senior level

Record against selected opponents 
Record against Year-end Finals finalists, World Championships semi-finalists, and Olympic quarter-finalists.

References

External links 
 

1989 births
Living people
Sportspeople from Jakarta
Indonesian female badminton players
Badminton players at the 2016 Summer Olympics
Olympic badminton players of Indonesia
Badminton players at the 2010 Asian Games
Badminton players at the 2014 Asian Games
Asian Games bronze medalists for Indonesia
Asian Games medalists in badminton
Medalists at the 2010 Asian Games
Competitors at the 2009 Southeast Asian Games
Competitors at the 2011 Southeast Asian Games
Competitors at the 2015 Southeast Asian Games
Southeast Asian Games silver medalists for Indonesia
Southeast Asian Games bronze medalists for Indonesia
Southeast Asian Games medalists in badminton
21st-century Indonesian women